was a Japanese professional Go player.

Biography 
Kubouchi became a professional 9-dan in 1960 for the Kansai Ki-in. His teacher was Katsukiyo Kubomatsu. He died in January 2020, a few days short of his one hundredth birthday.

Titles

See also 

 International Go Federation
 List of Go organizations
 List of professional Go tournaments

References 

1920 births
2020 deaths
Japanese Go players